Vespina quercivora is a moth of the  family Incurvariidae. It is found in California.

The wingspan is 7–9 mm for males and 7–10 mm for females. The forewings are uniformly fuscous, with a slight bronzy lustre. The hindwings are paler and grey. Adults are on wing from early June to late July, in one or possibly two generations per year.

The larvae feed on Quercus agrifolia. Young larvae mine the leaves of their host plant. When older, they create a case by cutting oval sections from the host leaves and continue feeding by skeletonising the leaves.

References

Incurvariidae
Endemic fauna of California
Moths of North America
Fauna of the California chaparral and woodlands
Moths described in 1972
Taxa named by Donald R. Davis (entomologist)
Fauna without expected TNC conservation status